In mathematics, a conchospiral a specific type of space spiral on the surface of a cone (a conical spiral), whose floor projection is a logarithmic spiral.
Conchospirals are used in biology for modelling snail shells, and flight paths of insects  and in electrical engineering for the construction of antennas.

Parameterization
In cylindrical coordinates, the conchospiral is described by the parametric equations:

The projection of a conchospiral on the   plane is a logarithmic spiral.
The parameter  controls the opening angle of the projected spiral, while the parameter  controls the slope of the cone on which the curve lies.

History
The name "conchospiral" was given to these curves by 19th-century German mineralogist Georg Amadeus Carl Friedrich Naumann, in his study of the shapes of sea shells.

Applications
The conchospiral has been used in the design for radio antennas. In this application, it has the advantage of producing a radio beam in a single direction, towards the apex of the cone.

References

External links

Spirals